Charles Mitchell Henry (December 11, 1992 – June 30, 2017) was an American football tight end. He played college football at Western Kentucky. Henry was signed by the Green Bay Packers as an undrafted free agent in 2015. He also played for the Denver Broncos and Baltimore Ravens.

Professional career

Green Bay Packers
After going undrafted in the 2015 NFL Draft, Henry signed with the Green Bay Packers on May 8, 2015.
On September 5, 2015, he was released by the Packers during final team cuts.

Denver Broncos
Henry was claimed off waivers by the Denver Broncos on September 6, 2015. He appeared in two games in the first five weeks of the Broncos season. On October 14, 2015, Henry was released by the Broncos to make room for the signing of tight end Richard Gordon.

Return to Green Bay
On October 16, 2015, Henry was signed to the Packers' practice squad, where he spent the rest of his rookie season. He was re-signed by the Packers after the season ended on January 18, 2016.

Entering his second season; Henry missed time during training camp due to a groin injury. He later broke the index finger on his right hand in the second preseason game against the Oakland Raiders, resulting in his having to wear a club cast on his hand for the second straight year. On August 30, 2016, Henry was placed on injured reserve. He was waived by the Packers after reaching an injury settlement on September 1, 2016.

Baltimore Ravens
Henry was signed to the Baltimore Ravens' practice squad on November 7, 2016 but was released three days later.

Career statistics

College

NFL

Personal life
In December 2016, Henry was diagnosed with acute myeloid leukemia after being released by the Ravens. He started feeling pain in his shoulder in November, and doctors later discovered a cancerous mass in his chest. Henry received well-wishes from former coach Mike McCarthy, former teammate Peyton Manning, and others. Henry had been told by the Ravens that he was going to be re-signed soon, but then started feeling pain a few days after he was cut.

On June 30, 2017, Henry died from acute myeloid leukemia at the age of 24. He is survived by his wife Madison.

References

External links
 
 Western Kentucky Hilltoppers bio
 

1992 births
2017 deaths
Players of American football from Lexington, Kentucky
Elizabethtown High School alumni
American football tight ends
Western Kentucky Hilltoppers football players
Denver Broncos players
Baltimore Ravens players
Green Bay Packers players
Deaths from leukemia
Deaths from cancer in Kentucky